VDG may refer to:
 Guatemalan Democratic Vanguard (Vanguardia Democrática Guatemalteca), a Guatemalan leftwing political group
 Giedo van der Garde, Dutch Formula One racing driver
 Van de Graaff generator, high voltage electrostatic generator developed by Robert J. Van de Graaff
 Video Display Generator, an integrated circuit found in computer video systems
 Several people with Dutch surnames including Van der Geest and Van de Graaf
 Veneral disease gonorrhea